Mercedes "Cheding" Kho Alvarez-Lansang is a Filipino politician who served as Deputy Speaker of the House of Representatives of the Philippines and represented the 6th district of Negros Occidental.

Family members
Rep. Alvarez is the daughter of former Vice Governor Genaro Alvarez Jr., himself a former representative of the district. On October 6, 2016, she married Major Dranreb "Dran" Lansang of the Philippine Army's 1st Scout Ranger Regiment.

As legislator
Alvarez was elected as member of the Board of the Forum of Young Parliamentarians from the Asia Pacific in Geneva, Switzerland. She also represented the Philippines to the Inter-Parliamentary Union conferences in New York and Tokyo. She was elected unopposed in the 2016 Philippine general election.

In the 17th Congress of the Philippines, she was elected as one of the Deputy Speakers under the leadership of Speaker Pantaleon Alvarez, as part of the multi-party coalition named Coalition for Change.

She was fondly known for her quirky pictures lying on the road in southern Negros, showed during the last State of Nation Address of President Benigno Aquino III. Rep. Alvarez is a staunch advocate of sustainable tourism practices in the "CHICKS area," which stands for 6th district towns and cities composed of Cauayan, Hinoba-an, Ilog, Candoni, Kabankalan and Sipalay.

References

Members of the House of Representatives of the Philippines from Negros Occidental
Deputy Speakers of the House of Representatives of the Philippines
People from Bacolod
Nationalist People's Coalition politicians
Assumption College San Lorenzo alumni
University of St. La Salle alumni
Visayan people